Carl Christoffer ”Calle” Haglund (born 29 March 1979 in Espoo) is the CEO of Veritas, a Finnish Pension insurance company, former MP,  former chairman of the Swedish People's Party and the former Minister of Defence. He was member of the European Parliament (MEP) from 2009 to 2012. Haglund was elected chairman of his party in June 2012. Haglund serves as the chairman of the board for Finnish Business and Policy Forum EVA and Research Institute of the Finnish Economy Etla.

In the 2015 Finnish parliamentary election Haglund received over 21,000 votes, the fourth largest number of votes in the country.
In March 2016, Haglund announced that he would not run for another term as the chairman, as he was disappointed in politics and wanted to spend more time with his family. On 12 June 2016, he was followed by the former Minister of Justice of Finland Anna-Maja Henriksson.

On 21 June 2016, Haglund announced that he would leave the Parliament to work for the Chinese bioenergy company Sunshine Kaidi New Energy Group. He left his seat on 30 July and was followed by Veronica Rehn-Kivi.
In 2018 he joined Accenture as its Nordic head of banking and insurance business.

Education
Haglund obtained his International Baccalaureate (IB) at Mattlidens Gymnasium in Espoo. He then went on to study at Sydväst Polytechnic (now Novia University of Applied Sciences), where he served as the secretary general of the students' union. Later, he studied public administration at Åbo Akademi University and also obtained his MBA from the Hanken School of Economics in 2007.

Personal life
Haglund has Fenno-Swedish background. He is married to Michaela (née Österberg) and has two children.

Awards 
  Order of the Polar Star (Sweden, Grand Cross, 2015)
  Order of the White Rose of Finland (Finland, Commander, 2014)

References

External links 
Carl Haglund - Swedish Parliamentary Group Parliament of Finland 

|-

|-

1979 births
Living people
People from Espoo
Ministers of Defence of Finland
Swedish People's Party of Finland politicians
Swedish People's Party of Finland MEPs
MEPs for Finland 2009–2014
Recipients of the Order of the Cross of Terra Mariana, 1st Class
Åbo Akademi University alumni